Al-Latif (Al-Laṭīf , also anglicized as Al-Lateef) is one of the names of God in Islam, meaning "kind". Latif can also be a masculine given name, as short form of Abdul Latif, meaning "servant of the Gentle". Its feminine form is Latifa. "Al-Latif" also means "The Subtle".

Notable persons 
Given name
Latif (singer/songwriter), full name Corey Latif Williams, American rhythm and blues singer
Latif (video game player), full name Abdullatif Alhmili (born 1990), Saudi-American fighting games player
Latif Afridi, Pakistani lawyer
Shah Abdul Latif, Pakistani poet
Latif Ahmadi, Afghan film director
Latif Halmat, or Letîf Helmet, Kurdish-Iraqi poet
Latif Kapadia, Pakistani stage and television actor
Latif Karimov, Azerbaijani carpet designer
Latif Khosa, politician, Governor of Punjab
Latif Nangarhari, Afghan singer
Latif Rahman, Singaporean football 
Latif Rashid, Iraqi politician and minister 
Latif Safarov, Azerbaijani actor and movie director.
Latif Salifu, Ghanaian football player 
Latif Yahia, Iraqi author and former body double

Family name
Aamir Latif, a former governor in Afghanistan
Ahmed Latif, Afghan film director
Amar Latif, a blind British entrepreneur, actor, director
Idris Hasan Latif, former Chief of Air Staff of the Indian Air Force
Khalid Latif (cricketer), Pakistani cricketer
Khalid Latif (imam), Chaplain (Imam) for the Islamic Center at New York University
Mohamed Latif, Egyptian football player
Mojib Latif, German-Pakistani meteorologist and oceanographer
Muhammed Latif, Iraqi major general and politician
Muid Latif, Malaysian web designer and digital artist
Naved Latif, a Pakistani cricketer
Nazir Latif, Pakistan Air Force officer
Rashid Latif, Pakistani cricket player 
Rizwan Latif, Pakistani-UAE cricket player
Shaheed Latif, Hindi film director, writer and producer.
Shazad Latif, a British television actor

See also
 Lateef (disambiguation)
 Lutfi
 Lutfullah

Arabic-language surnames
Arabic masculine given names
Names of God in Islam